Tirupatipuram is a village in West Godavari district in the state of Andhra Pradesh in India.

Demographics
 India census, Tirupatipuram has a population of 3329 of which 1684 are males while 1645 are females. The average sex ratio of Tirupatipuram village is 977. The child population is 248, which makes up 7.45% of the total population of the village, with sex ratio 879. In 2011, the literacy rate of Tirupatipuram village was 79.88% when compared to 67.02% of Andhra Pradesh.

See also 
 Eluru

References 

Villages in West Godavari district